Elaine Kalman Naves (born 1947) is a Hungarian-born Canadian writer, journalist, editor and lecturer from Quebec.  

She has twice won the Quebec Writers' Federation Awards Mavis Gallant Prize for Non-Fiction, in 1999 for Putting Down Roots and in 2003 for Shoshanna's Story. Her 2015 novel The Book of Faith was on the long list in 2016 for The Leacock Award.

Biography
Naves was born in Hungary in 1947, though her family moved to England in the wake of the Revolution of 1956. They eventually immigrated to Canada. 

Naves attended McGill University, where she studied history, as well as Bishop's University, where she studied education. Following graduation from each, she taught English and History at the secondary level, then served as a historian for the Centre d’Étude du Québec of Sir George Williams University.

Awards and honours
Montreal Gazette named Shoshanna's Story one of the best books of 2003.

Publications
 Journey to Vaja: Reconstructing the World of a Hungarian-Jewish Family (1996, McGill-Queen's University Press)
 Putting Down Roots, Montreal's Immigrant Writers (1998,  Press)
 Storied Streets: Montreal in the Literary Imagination, with Bryan Demchinsky (2000, Macfarlane Walter & Ross)
 Shoshanna's Story: A Mother, Daughter, and the Shadows of History (2003, McClelland & Stewart)
 Robert Weaver: Godfather of Canadian Literature (2008, Véhicule Press)
 Portrait of a Scandal: The Trial of Robert Notman (2014, Véhicule Press)
 The Book of Faith (2015, Linda Leith Publishing)
 "Shoshanna. Mère et fille dans les ténèbres de l'histoire", traduit par Chantal Ringuet, Éditions Alias, Groupe Nota Bene, 2017.

References

External links 

 Official website
 
 
 

20th-century Canadian women writers
Writers from Quebec
Living people
1947 births
Date of birth missing (living people)
Place of birth missing (living people)
20th-century Canadian non-fiction writers
21st-century Canadian non-fiction writers
21st-century Canadian women writers
Canadian women non-fiction writers